Louis Gailliard (13 September 1912 – 10 June 1996) was a French hurdler. He competed in the men's 400 metres hurdles at the 1936 Summer Olympics.

References

External links
 

1912 births
1996 deaths
Athletes (track and field) at the 1936 Summer Olympics
French male hurdlers
Olympic athletes of France
20th-century French people